Monopeltis is a genus of amphisbaenians in the family Amphisbaenidae. Species in the genus are commonly known as worm lizards, even though they are not lizards. The genus is endemic to southern Africa. 19 species are placed in this genus.

Species
The following species are recognized as being valid.
Monopeltis adercae  – Lualaba worm lizard
Monopeltis anchietae  – Angolan spade-snouted worm lizard, Anchieta's worm lizard
Monopeltis capensis  – Cape worm lizard, South African shield-snouted amphisbaenian, Cape wedge-snouted worm lizard 
Monopeltis decosteri  – De Coster's worm lizard
Monopeltis galeata  – helmeted worm lizard
Monopeltis guentheri  – Western Congo worm lizard
Monopeltis infuscata  – dusky spade-snouted worm lizard, infuscate wedge-snouted amphisbaenian
Monopeltis jugularis  – Gaboon worm lizard
Monopeltis kabindae  – Kabinda worm lizard
Monopeltis leonhardi  – Kalahari worm lizard 
Monopeltis luandae 
Monopeltis perplexus 
Monopeltis remaclei  – Witte's worm lizard
Monopeltis rhodesiana 
Monopeltis scalper  – carved worm lizard
Monopeltis schoutedeni  – Middle Congo worm lizard 
Monopeltis sphenorhynchus  – slender spade-snouted worm lizard, Maurice's spade-snouted worm lizard
Monopeltis vanderysti  – Vanderyst worm lizard
Monopeltis zambezensis 

Nota bene: A binomial authority in parentheses indicates that the species was originally described in a genus other than Monopeltis.

References

Further reading

Boulenger GA (1885). Catalogue of the Lizards in the British Museum (Natural History). Second Edition. Volume II. ... Amphisbænidæ. London: Trustees of the British Museum (Natural History). (Taylor and Francis, printers). xiii + 497 pp. + Plates I–XXIV. (Genus Monopeltis, pp. 453–454; key to species, p. 454; species accounts, pp. 455–459).
Branch, Bill (2004). Field Guide to Snakes and other Reptiles of Southern Africa. Third Revised edition, Second impression. Sanibel Island, Florida: Ralph Curtis Books. 399 pp. . (Genus Monopeltis, p. 124).
Gans C (2005). "Checklist and Bibliography of the Amphisbaenia of the World". Bulletin of the American Museum of Natural History (289): 1-130.

 
Lizard genera
Taxa named by Andrew Smith (zoologist)